The Beverly Hills Playhouse is an acting school with theaters and training facilities in Beverly Hills, California, and also in Los Angeles, San Francisco, and New York City. It is one of the oldest acting schools and theatres in the Los Angeles area.

The early years
The location was originally home to the respected Bliss-Hayden School of Acting run by a husband and wife team of motion picture actors—actress Lela Bliss with over 45 credits stretching from 1915 to 1965, and her husband actor Harry Hayden with over 260 credits from 1936 to 1955. Veronica Lake, Mamie Van Doren and many other professional actors studied there.

In 1954, the Bliss-Hayden Theatre was acquired by Douglas Frank Bank and Jay Manford, and renamed The Beverly Hills Playhouse. This was a showcase for many productions written by Douglas Bank (The Preacher, and Journey to a Lonely Star) as well as well-known plays of the time including Jenny Kissed Me, Room Service, The Lawyer, Harvey, and The Second Man. Many actors had performed there including Stanley Adams, Anne Baxter, Ken Mayer, Michael Fox and Louella Parsons, and directors Larry Stewart and Arthur M. Lowe, Jr., as well as others. They owned the theatre until 1959.

Modern era
In 1978, Milton Katselas, the noted director and acting teacher, moved his already established and renowned acting classes to the location. For the next 30 years he taught such stars as George Clooney, Lana Parrilla, Alec Baldwin, Giovanni Ribisi, Tom Selleck, Michelle Pfeiffer, Ted Danson, Tony Danza, Jeffrey Tambor, Gene Reynolds, Tyne Daly, Mel Harris, Catherine Bell, Sofia Milos, Christy Carlson Romano, Jenna Elfman, Doris Roberts, Patrick Swayze, Miguel Ferrer, James Cromwell, Anne Archer, Larry Miller, John Glover, James Wilder, Jennifer Aspen, Jorge Garcia.

The Beverly Hills Playhouse (BHP) Acting School
The Beverly Hills Playhouse is one of the city's oldest and most respected. The BHP is one of only a few schools that not only teaches the craft of acting, but also attitude and administration. With regard to acting technique, the BHP uses Katselas' approach, which is decidedly independent of the major acting philosophies of Stanislavski, Strasberg, Adler, Meisner, Hagen, etc. His experience as a director led him to a highly individual and adaptive way of training actors, mostly based in the simple observation and recreation of human behavior, along with an understanding of what's happening in the story. It is a down-to-earth training, with vastly reduced emphasis on exercises, and with techniques to create full, believable performances that enlighten and entertain.

There has been some controversy regarding the BHP and Scientology. This was because Milton Katselas was a well-known Scientologist, and as such drew the favor of Scientologist actors such as Anne Archer, Giovanni Ribisi, Marisol Nichols, Catherine Bell, Jenna Elfman and others who were his students as well. Some of the teachers on the staff of the school were Scientologists. During Milton's life there were persistent rumors that he was trying to proselytize his religion through his teaching - but the total percentage of students who had any connection with Scientology was never more than 10%, and in 2004 Katselas in fact fell out of favor with Scientologist celebrities. By 2007, almost all those involved with the movement left the school. Also, as Katselas was highly respected by countless non-Scientologist actors such as Doris Roberts and John Glover, his reputation remained primarily that of a first rate teacher above all else. Since Katselas' death in 2008, the BHP has been run by his longtime administrators Allen Barton, Gary Grossman and Art Cohan - longtime teachers in their own right at the school, and the BHP's connection with Scientology appears currently to be zero.

The BHP operates out of its headquarters in Beverly Hills, but also has a satellite operation in Los Feliz at the Skylight Theatre, as well as programs in San Francisco and New York City. Since 1984, it has also had an in-house non-profit theatre company (currently called The Skylight Theatre Company), which has produced hundreds of theatre productions, largely originated and fulfilled by the talent and interests of the BHP students. Its current focus under the leadership of Gary Grossman is the development of new plays, using the full array of talent available in the Los Angeles theatre community.

Notable Productions
 A Christmas Held Captive

References

External links
Beverly Hills Playhouse web site

Buildings and structures in Beverly Hills, California
Theatres in Los Angeles County, California
Performing arts education in the United States
Performing groups established in 1954
1954 establishments in California
Performing arts in California